The 2018 Houston Outlaws season was the first season of the Houston Outlaws's existence in the Overwatch League. Outlaws qualified for the Stage 1 playoffs but fell to the London Spitfire in the semifinals. The team did not qualify finished with a regular season record of 22–18, missing the season playoffs.

Preceding offseason 
On October 31, 2017, Houston Outlaws announced their inaugural season roster, consisting of the following players:
Matthew "Clockwork" Dias
Lucas "Mendokusaii" Håkansson
Jiri "LiNkzr" Masalin
Jake "Jake" Lyon
Austin "Muma" Wilmot
Matt "Coolmatt" Iorio
Shane "Rawkus" Flaherty
Christopher "Bani" Benell
Daniel "Boink" Pence
Alexandre "SPREE" Vanhomwegen

Regular season

Review 
On January 11, the Outlaws played their first regular season Overwatch League match, a 3–2 loss to the Philadelphia Fusion. One week later, on January 17, Houston claimed their first victory after sweeping the Shanghai Dragons 4–0. Houston went on to qualify for the Stage 1 playoffs but fell to the London Spitfire in the semifinals.

Houston entered their last regular season match against the New York Excelsior needing a win to keep their season playoff hopes alive. The Outlaws had a 2–1 lead after three matches, but New York won the next three straight to take the win 3–2. The team finished with a regular season record of 22–18.

Final roster

Transactions 
Transactions of/for players on the roster during the 2018 regular season:
On February 16, Outlaws signed Russell "FCTFCTN" Campbell.
On March 30, Outlaws signed Jung "ArHaN" Won-hyeop.

Standings

Record by stage

League

Game log

Preseason

Regular season

Playoffs

References 

2018 Overwatch League seasons by team
Houston Outlaws
Houston Outlaws seasons